In the Name of the Son is a 2012 black comedy film directed by Vincent Lannoo, who wrote the film with Albert Charles and Philippe Falardeau. It had its world premiere at the Namur Film Festival on 29 September 2012.

The film received seven nominations at the 2013 Magritte Awards, including Best Film and Best Director for Lannoo, winning Most Promising Actor for Achille Ridolfi.

Cast
 Astrid Whettnall as Elisabeth
 Philippe Nahon as Father Taon
 Achille Ridolfi as Achille
 Albert Chassagne-Baradat
 Zacharie Chasseriaud as Jean-Charles
 Lionel Bourguet
 Jacky Nercessian

Accolades

References

External links
 

2012 films
2012 black comedy films
2010s French-language films
Belgian black comedy films
Films about pedophilia
Films about suicide
Films critical of the Catholic Church
Films set in Belgium
Films shot in Belgium
Films shot in France
French black comedy films
French-language Belgian films
2010s French films